Deon Carstens (born 3 June 1979 in Goodwood, Cape Town), is a former South African rugby union footballer. He also played for Saracens in the English Premiership.

He announced his retirement in 2013 after an ongoing back injury.

Career
Carstens attended Franschoek Primary and Boland High School and represented the South African Under-19 side in 1998 at tight head prop. Carstens made his senior provincial and Super rugby debut in 2001 for the Sharks. He was selected to tour Europe with the South African national side in 2002 and made his test debut on that tour, against Scotland on 16 November 2002. Scotland won the match by a record score of 21 points to 6. He is a versatile player who can cover either side of the front row. In April 2010 it was announced that Carstens had agreed to join the Saracens FC for the 2010–11 season. In November 2011, it was announced that he returned to South Africa to join the Stormers for the 2012 Super Rugby season. Carstens has won the Currie Cup 3 times, twice with Natal (2008 & 2010) and once with Western Province (2012). He was also part of the Saracens squad that won the 2010–11 English Premiership.

References

1979 births
Living people
Afrikaner people
South African rugby union players
South Africa international rugby union players
Rugby union players from Cape Town
Rugby union props
Sharks (rugby union) players
Sharks (Currie Cup) players
Stormers players
Western Province (rugby union) players
Saracens F.C. players